Christmas Eve is the evening or entire day before Christmas Day, the festival commemorating the birth of Jesus. Christmas Day is observed around the world, and Christmas Eve is widely observed as a full or partial holiday in anticipation of Christmas Day. Together, both days are considered one of the most culturally significant celebrations in Christendom and Western society.

Christmas celebrations in the denominations of Western Christianity have long begun on Christmas Eve, due in part to the Christian liturgical day starting at sunset, a practice inherited from Jewish tradition and based on the story of Creation in the Book of Genesis: "And there was evening, and there was morning – the first day." Many churches still ring their church bells and hold prayers in the evening; for example, the Nordic Lutheran churches. Since tradition holds that Jesus was born at night (based in Luke 2:6-8), Midnight Mass is celebrated on Christmas Eve, traditionally at midnight, in commemoration of his birth. The idea of Jesus being born at night is reflected in the fact that Christmas Eve is referred to as Heilige Nacht (Holy Night) in German, Nochebuena (the Good Night) in Spanish and similarly in other expressions of Christmas spirituality, such as the song "Silent Night, Holy Night".

Many other varying cultural traditions and experiences are also associated with Christmas Eve around the world, including the gathering of family and friends, the singing of Christmas carols, the illumination and enjoyment of Christmas lights, trees, and other decorations, the wrapping, exchange and opening of gifts, and general preparation for Christmas Day. Legendary Christmas gift-bearing figures including Santa Claus, Father Christmas, Christkind, and Saint Nicholas are also often said to depart for their annual journey to deliver presents to children around the world on Christmas Eve, although until the Protestant introduction of Christkind in 16th-century Europe, such figures were said to instead deliver presents on the eve of Saint Nicholas' feast day (6 December).

Religious traditions

Western churches 

Roman Catholics, Lutherans, and some Anglicans traditionally celebrate Midnight Mass, which begins either at or sometime before midnight on Christmas Eve.  This ceremony, which is held in churches throughout the world, celebrates the birth of Christ, which is believed to have occurred at night. Midnight Mass is popular in Poland (pasterka) and Lithuania (piemenėlių mišios).

In recent years some churches have scheduled their "Midnight" Mass as early as 7 pm.  This better suits the young children, whose choral singing has become a popular feature in some traditions. In Spanish-speaking areas, the Midnight Mass is sometimes referred to as Misa de Gallo, or Missa do Galo in Portuguese ("Rooster's Mass"). In the Philippines, the custom has expanded into the nine-day Simbang Gabi, when Filipinos attend dawn Masses (traditionally beginning around 04:00 to 05:00 PST) from 16 December, continuing daily until Christmas Eve. In 2009 Vatican officials scheduled the Midnight Mass to start at 10 pm so that the 82-year-old Pope Benedict XVI would not have too late a night.

A nativity scene may be erected indoors or outdoors, and is composed of figurines depicting the infant Jesus resting in a manger, Mary, and Joseph. Other figures in the scene may include angels, shepherds, and various animals. The figures may be made of any material, and arranged in a stable or grotto. The Magi may also appear, and are sometimes not placed in the scene until the week following Christmas to account for their travel time to Bethlehem.  While most home nativity scenes are packed away at Christmas or shortly thereafter, nativity scenes in churches usually remain on display until the feast of the Baptism of the Lord.

Whilst it does not include any kind of Mass, the Church of Scotland has a service beginning just before midnight, in which carols are sung. The Church of Scotland no longer holds Hogmanay services on New Year's Eve, however. The Christmas Eve Services are still very popular.
On Christmas Eve, the Christ Candle in the center of the Advent wreath is traditionally lit in many church services. In candlelight services, while singing Silent Night, each member of the congregation receives a candle and passes along their flame which is first received from the Christ Candle.

Lutherans traditionally practice Christmas Eve Eucharistic traditions typical of Germany and Scandinavia. "Krippenspiele" (Nativity plays), special festive music for organ, vocal and brass choirs and candlelight services make Christmas Eve one of the most beloved days in the Lutheran Church calendar. Christmas Vespers is popular in the early evening, and Midnight Masses are also widespread in regions which are predominantly Lutheran. The old Lutheran tradition of a Christmas Vigil in the early morning hours of Christmas Day (Christmette) can still be found in some regions. In eastern and middle Germany, congregations still continue the tradition of "Quempas singing": separate groups dispersed in various parts of the church sing verses of the song "He whom shepherds once came Praising" (Quem pastores laudavere) responsively.

Methodists celebrate the evening in different ways. Some, in the early evening, come to their church to celebrate Holy Communion with their families. The mood is very solemn, and the only visible light is the Advent Wreath, and the candles upon the Lord's Table. Others celebrate the evening with services of light, which include singing the song Silent Night as a variety of candles (including personal candles) are lit. Other churches have late evening services perhaps at 11 pm, so that the church can celebrate Christmas Day together with the ringing of bells at midnight. Others offer Christmas Day services as well.

The annual "Nine Lessons and Carols", broadcast from King's College, Cambridge on Christmas Eve, has established itself a Christmas custom in the United Kingdom. It is broadcast outside the UK via the BBC World Service, and is also bought by broadcasters around the world.

Eastern churches 

In the Byzantine Rite, Christmas Eve is referred to as Paramony ("preparation").  It is the concluding day of the Nativity Fast and is observed as a day of strict fasting by those devout Byzantine Christians who are physically capable of doing so. In some traditions, nothing is eaten until the first star appears in the evening sky, in commemoration of the Star of Bethlehem. The liturgical celebration begins earlier in the day with the celebration of the Royal Hours, followed by the Divine Liturgy combined with the celebration of Vespers, during which a large number of passages from the Old Testament are chanted, recounting the history of salvation. After the dismissal at the end of the service, a new candle is brought out into the center of the church and lit, and all gather round and sing the Troparion and Kontakion of the Feast.

In the evening, the All-Night Vigil for the Feast of the Nativity is composed of Great Compline, Matins and the First Hour. The Byzantine services of Christmas Eve are intentionally parallel to those of Good Friday, illustrating the theological point that the purpose of the Incarnation was to make possible the Crucifixion and Resurrection. This is illustrated in Eastern icons of the Nativity, on which the Christ Child is wrapped in swaddling clothes reminiscent of his burial wrappings. The child is also shown lying on a stone, representing the Tomb of Christ, rather than a manger. The Cave of the Nativity is also a reminder of the cave in which Jesus was buried.

The services of Christmas Eve are also similar to those of the Eve of Theophany (Epiphany), and the two Great Feasts are considered one celebration.

In some Orthodox cultures, after the Vesperal Liturgy the family returns home to a festive meal, but one at which Orthodox fasting rules are still observed: no meat or dairy products (milk, cheese, eggs, etc.) are consumed (see below for variations according to nationality). Then they return to the church for the All-Night Vigil.

The next morning, Christmas Day, the Divine Liturgy is celebrated again, but with special features that occur only on Great Feasts of the Lord. After the dismissal of this Liturgy, the faithful customarily greet each other with the kiss of peace and the words: "Christ is Born!", to which the one being greeted responds: "Glorify Him!" (the opening words of the Canon of the Nativity that was chanted the night before during the Vigil). This greeting, together with many of the hymns of the feast, continue to be used until the leave-taking of the feast on 29 December.

The first three days of the feast are particularly solemn. The second day is known as the Synaxis of the Theotokos, and commemorates the role of the Virgin Mary in the Nativity of Jesus. The third day is referred to simply as "the Third Day of the Nativity". The Saturday and Sunday following 25 December have special Epistle and Gospel readings assigned to them. 29 December celebrates the Holy Innocents.

Byzantine Christians observe a festal period of twelve days, during which no one in the Church fasts, even on Wednesdays and Fridays, which are normal fasting days throughout the rest of the year. During this time one feast leads into another: 25–31 December is the afterfeast of the Nativity; 2–5 January is the forefeast of the Epiphany.

Meals

Bulgaria 

In Bulgaria, the meal consists of an odd number of lenten dishes in compliance with the rules of fasting. They are usually the traditional sarma, bob chorba (bean soup), fortune kravai (pastry with a fortune in it; also called bogovitsa, vechernik, kolednik), stuffed peppers, nuts, dried fruit, boiled wheat. The meal is often accompanied with wine or Bulgaria's traditional alcoholic beverage rakia, in the past olovina (a type of homemade rye beer). The meals used to be put on top of hay, directly on the floor, together with a ploughshare or a coulter.

Czech Republic 

In the Czech Republic, fasting on the day of Christmas Eve (or only eating meatless food) is a medieval tradition. The belief is that if one lasted until Christmas dinner, they would see a golden pig, which is a symbol of luck. A typical Christmas breakfast is a sweet braided bread vánočka. Christmas Eve dinner traditionally consists of a carp (baked or fried) and a potato salad.

France 

In French-speaking places, Réveillon is a long dinner eaten on Christmas Eve.

Guam and the Northern Marianas 
In Guam and the Northern Marianas, dishes include shrimp kelaguen; coconut crab; and kadon octopus (octopus stewed in sweet peppers and coconut milk). Beef is a rarity, but a popular dish is tinaktak, ground beef in coconut milk.

Italy 

While other Christian families throughout the world celebrate the Christmas Eve meal with various meats, Italians (especially Sicilians) celebrate the traditional Catholic "Feast of the Seven Fishes" which was historically served after a 24-hour fasting period. Although Christmas fasting is no longer a popular custom, some Italian-Americans still enjoy a meatless Christmas Eve feast and attend the Midnight Mass. In various cultures, a festive dinner is traditionally served for the family and close friends in attendance, when the first star (usually Sirius) appears in the sky.

Latin America 

 In Peru, turkey and panettone are the stars of Christmas Eve.

 In Venezuela, hallacas are normally the staple dish for Noche Buena alongside of either ham or pork leg known as "pernil", panettone, rum and "Ponche Crema" (a form of alcoholic eggnog). The night is usually accompanied by traditional Christmas music known as "aguinaldos"; in Venezuela, the traditional music is known as joropo.

Lithuania 

Lithuanian Christmas Eve blends pagan and Christian traditions, as initially it was a celebration of the winter solstice. Traditionally, Lithuanians believed that animals could talk on that night, and it was possible to predict the future with charms and various games. Kūčios ("Holy Meal") is the most important event of the year and family reunion. Dead relatives are remembered with an empty plate set at the table. The feast starts after the rise of the evening star. No products made from meat, milk and alcohol are allowed during the Kūčios. In all, 12 dishes are served, all of them rustic, made from grains, fish, dried fruit or mushrooms including kūčiukai. Small biscuits soaked in poppy seed milk are served. After the dinner is over the table is left uncleared overnight for the feast of vėlės (spirits or soul).

Poland 

A tradition similar to Italy (Wigilia, or 'Christmas Vigil') exists in Poland. The number of dishes is traditionally 12, but has been an odd number in the past. According to the Słownik etymologiczny języka polskiego (Etymological Dictionary of the Polish Language) by Aleksander Brückner, the number of dishes was traditionally related to social class: the peasants' vigil consisted of 5 or 7 dishes, the gentry usually had 9, and the aristocracy, 11 dishes, but the even number 12 is also found today to remember the Twelve Apostles. It is obligatory to try a portion of all of them. Some traditions specify that the number of guests cannot be odd.

In Poland, gifts are unwrapped on Christmas Eve, as opposed to Christmas Day. It comes from fusing the traditions of Saint Nicholas Day (6 December) and Christmas. In the past, gifts were opened on the morning of Saint Nicholas Day.

Russia 

Rozhdenstvenskiy sochelnik was a common Eastern Orthodox tradition in the Russian Empire, but during the era of the Soviet Union it was greatly discouraged as a result of the official atheism of the former regime. 

In modern-day Russia, the church has a service on that day, but the celebration itself has not yet regained its popularity among the people. Instead of the Christmas Eve, New Year's Eve is considered to be a traditional family celebration featuring the New Year tree.

Serbia 

In accordance with the Christmas traditions of the Serbs, their festive meal has a copious and diverse selection of foods, although it is prepared according to the rules of fasting.

As well as a round, unleavened loaf of bread and salt, which are necessary, this meal may comprise roast fish, cooked beans, sauerkraut, noodles with ground walnuts, honey, and wine.

Families in some Slavic countries leave an empty place at the table for guests (alluding to Mary and Joseph looking for shelter in Bethlehem).

Ukraine 

In Ukraine, Sviatyi Vechir (Holy Evening) is traditionally celebrated with a meatless twelve-dish Christmas Eve supper, or the Holy Supper (Sviata Vecheria). The main attributes of the Holy Supper in Ukraine are kutia, a poppy seed, honey and wheat dish, and uzvar, a drink made from reconstituted dried fruits. Other typical dishes are borscht, varenyky, and dishes made of fish, phaseolus and cabbage. 

The twelve dishes symbolize the Twelve Apostles. Just as in Poland, it is obligatory to try a portion of all of the dishes. The table is spread with a white cloth symbolic of the swaddling clothes the Child Jesus was wrapped in, and a large white candle stands in the center of the table symbolizing Christ the Light of the World. Next to it is a round loaf of bread symbolizing Christ Bread of Life. Hay is often displayed either on the table or as a decoration in the room, reminiscent of the manger in Bethlehem.

Gift giving 

During the Reformation in 16th- and 17th-century Europe, many Protestants changed the gift bringer to the Christ Child or Christkindl, and the date of giving gifts changed from 6 December to Christmas Eve. It is the night when Santa Claus makes his rounds delivering gifts to good children. Many trace the custom of giving gifts to the Magi who brought gifts for the Christ child in the manger.

In Austria, Croatia, the Czech Republic, Hungary, and Slovakia, where Saint Nicholas (sv. Mikuláš/szent Mikulás) gives gifts on 6 December, the Christmas gift-giver is the Child Jesus (Ježíšek in Czech, Jézuska in Hungarian, Ježiško in Slovak and Isusek in Croatian).

In Austria, the Czech Republic, Denmark, Finland, Germany, Hungary, Norway, Poland, Slovakia, Sweden and Switzerland, presents are traditionally exchanged on the evening of 24 December. Children are commonly told that presents were brought either by the Christkind (German for Christ child), or by the Weihnachtsmann. Both leave the gifts, but are in most families not seen doing so. In Germany, the gifts are also brought on 6 December by "the Nikolaus" with his helper Knecht Ruprecht.

In Estonia Jõuluvana, Finland Joulupukki, Denmark Julemanden, Norway Julenissen  and Sweden Jultomten, personally meets children and gives presents in the evening of Christmas Eve.

In Argentina, Austria, Brazil, Colombia, Croatia, the Czech Republic, Denmark, Estonia, the Faroe Islands, Finland, France, Germany, Hungary, Iceland, Latvia, Lithuania, Luxembourg, Norway, Poland, Portugal, Quebec (French Canada), Romania, Uruguay, Slovakia, Slovenia, Sweden, and Switzerland, Christmas presents are opened mostly on the evening of the 24th – following German tradition, this is also the practice among the British Royal Family since it was introduced by Queen Victoria and Albert, Prince Consort – while in Italy, the United States, the United Kingdom, Republic of Ireland, Malta, English Canada, South Africa, New Zealand and Australia, this occurs mostly on the morning of Christmas Day.

In other Latin American countries, people stay awake until midnight, when they open the presents.

In Spain, gifts are traditionally opened on the morning of 6 January, Epiphany day ("Día de Los Tres Reyes Magos"), though in some other countries, like Mexico, Argentina and Uruguay, people receive presents both around Christmas and on the morning of Epiphany day.

In Belgium and the Netherlands Saint Nicholas or Sinterklaas and his companion Zwarte Piet deliver presents to children and adults alike on the evening of 5 December, the eve of his nameday. On 24 December they go to church or watch the late-night Mass on TV, or have a meal.

Christmas Eve around the world 

Christmas Eve is celebrated in different ways around the world, varying by country and region. Elements common to many areas of the world include the attendance of special religious observances such as a midnight Mass or Vespers and the giving and receiving of presents. Along with Easter, Christmastime is one of the most important periods on the Christian calendar, and is often closely connected to other holidays at this time of year, such as Advent, the Feast of the Immaculate Conception, St. Nicholas Day, St. Stephen's Day, New Year's, and the Feast of the Epiphany.

Celebrations 

Among Christians, as well as non-Christians who celebrate Christmas, the significant amount of vacation travel, and travel back to family homes, that takes place in the lead-up to Christmas means that Christmas Eve is also frequently a time of social events and parties, worldwide.

In Jewish culture 
Nittel Nacht is a name given to Christmas Eve by Jewish scholars in the 17th century.

In contemporary American-Jewish culture 

With Christmas Day a work holiday throughout the United States, there is a space of unfilled free time during which much of American commerce and society is not functioning, and which can give rise to a sense of loneliness or alienation for American Jews.

Jews also typically do not engage in the family gathering and religious worship activities that are central to Christmas Eve for Christians.

Typical contemporary activities have usually been limited to "Chinese and a movie"—consuming a meal at a Chinese restaurant, which tend to be open for business on the Christmas holiday, and watching a movie at the theater or at home, stereotypically a rerun of the 1946 film It's a Wonderful Life.

Since the 1980s a variety of social events for young Jews have sprung up, and become popular, on Christmas Eve. These include the Matzo Ball, The Ball, and a number of local events organized by Jewish communities and local Jewish Federations in North America.

In Chinese culture 
In Mandarin, Christmas Eve is called  ("peaceful night", etymologically from the Chinese title of the Christmas carol Silent Night). People exchange apples, because the word for "apple" (果) is a rhyming wordplay with "peace" (安).

In Inuit culture 
In Inuit territories, Christmas Eve is called Quviasukvik. The Inuit celebrate it as their new year.

Latin America 

For Latin American cultures, Christmas Eve is often the biggest feast for the Christmas season. Typically a dinner is served with the family, sometimes after attending the late Mass known as Misa de Gallo. Some regions include a fasting before midnight dinner. In much of Latin America the evening consists of a traditional family dinner for the adults. In some areas Christmas Eve marks the final evening of the Posadas celebrations.

Cuba 
In Cuba, roasted pig (lechón) is often the center of Christmas Eve (Nochebuena). It is believed that the tradition dates back to the 15th century when Caribbean colonists hunted down pigs and roasted them with a powerful flame.

In Cuban and Cuban-American tradition, the pig is sometimes cooked in a Caja China, a large box where an entire pig is placed below hot coals. The dinner features many side dishes and desserts, and often games of dominoes are played. The tradition is continued by Cuban families in Florida and the United States.
The dinner on the 24th, Christmas Eve itself, is the center of the celebration. That day — it may also be 31 — for many it is important to wear a new piece of clothing, be it a jacket or underwear.

The Cuban family does not have a fixed time for dinner. It is necessary, yes, in most of the Island, to have it as a family, and it is expected to be all at the table to start tasting the frijoles negros dormidos [sleeping black beans] and the arroz blanco desgranado y reluciente [shredded white rice], the yuca con mojo [Cuban side dish made by marinating yuca root (also known as cassava) in garlic, sour orange, and olive oil], the roasted pork or the stuffed or unfilled guanajo that, along with homemade desserts, such as Christmas fritters, and a wide range of sweets in syrup and Spanish nougat.
The visit to the archipelago of Pope John Paul II, in 1998, promoted the Cuban State, in a gesture of goodwill, to declare December 25 again as a holiday, which had stopped happening for several decades.

New Mexico 
In New Mexico and areas of San Diego, California, Christmas Eve (nochebuena) is celebrated by lighting luminarias and farolitos.

Philippines 

In the Philippines, the traditional dinner is served at midnight after the family attends the late evening Mass known as Misa de Gallo (sometimes referred to as Misa de Aguinaldo, "Gift Mass"). Conventional dishes served for the main course include: lechón, pancit, sweet-tasting spaghetti, fried chicken, jamón, queso de bola, arróz caldo, lumpia, turkey, relyenong bangús (stuffed milkfish), adobo, steamed rice, and various breads such as pan de sal. Desserts include úbe halayá, bibingka, membrilyo, fruit salad, various rice- and flour-based pastries, ice cream, and fruits, while popular beverages are tsokolate as well as coffee, soda, wine, beer, alcoholic drinks, and fruit juices.

Historical events 

A number of historical events have been influenced by the occurrence of Christmas Eve.

Christmas truce 

During World War I in 1914 and 1915 there was an unofficial Christmas truce, particularly between British and German troops. The truce began on Christmas Eve, 24 December 1914, when German troops began decorating the area around their trenches in the region of Ypres, Belgium, for Christmas. They began by placing candles on trees, then continued the celebration by singing Christmas carols, most notably Stille Nacht ("Silent Night"). The British troops in the trenches across from them responded by singing English carols. The two sides shouted Christmas greetings to each other. Soon there were calls for visits across the "No man's land" when small gifts were exchanged. The truce also allowed a breathing space during which recently killed soldiers could be brought back behind their lines by burial parties. Funerals took place as soldiers from both sides mourned the dead together and paid their respects. At one funeral in No Man's Land, soldiers from both sides gathered and read a passage from Psalm 23. The truce occurred in spite of opposition at higher levels of the military command. Earlier in the autumn, a call by Pope Benedict XV for an official truce between the warring governments had been ignored.

Apollo 8 reading from Genesis 

On 24 December 1968, in what was the most watched television broadcast to that date, the astronauts Bill Anders, Jim Lovell and Frank Borman of Apollo 8 surprised the world with a reading of the Creation from the Book of Genesis as they orbited the Moon. Madalyn Murray O'Hair, an atheist activist, filed a lawsuit under the Establishment Clause of the First Amendment. The trial court dismissed the lawsuit, which was upheld on appeal.

In 1969, the United States Postal Service issued a stamp (Scott# 1371) commemorating the Apollo 8 flight around the Moon. The stamp featured a detail of the famous photograph, Earthrise, of the Earth "rising" over the Moon (NASA image AS8-14-2383HR), taken by Anders on Christmas Eve, and the words, "In the beginning God...".

See also 

 Christmas Day
 Nativity of Jesus
 Santa Claus
 Winter holiday season
 Réveillon

References

External links 
 
 

Nativity of Jesus in worship and liturgy
Christmas events and celebrations
December observances
Holidays
Public holidays in Bulgaria
Public holidays in the Czech Republic
Public holidays in Denmark
Public holidays in El Salvador
Public holidays in Estonia
Public holidays in Finland
Public holidays in Iceland
Public holidays in Lithuania
Public holidays in Slovakia
Public holidays in Sweden
Public holidays in Venezuela

da:Jul#Juleaften